Peter Kohlgraf (born March 21, 1967 in Cologne, West Germany) is a German Roman Catholic bishop. He is the current Bishop of Mainz.

Life 
Kohlgraf was born the son of a mason and a nurse. After his Abitur in 1986 at the Dreikönigsgymnasium in Cologne, he studied philosophy and Catholic theology at the University of Bonn and for one semester in Salzburg. Kohlgraf graduated from university in 1991 and went to the seminary of the Archdiocese of Cologne. On June 19, 1993 he was ordained in Cologne Cathedral by the Archbishop of Cologne, Joachim Kardinal Meisner – together with the later Archbishop of Hamburg Stefan Heße and the later suffragan bishop of Cologne, Dominikus Schwaderlapp. The first positions of Kohlgraf as a priest were in Euskirchen and in Bad Honnef-Rhöndorf, before he became school-chaplain at the Kardinal-Frings-Gymnasium in Bonn-Beuel in 1999. In 2000, he gained his doctorate at Ernst Dassmann at the University of Bonn with the topic The ecclesiology of the Episcopal Letter in the interpretation by John Chrysostom.

Peter Kohlgraf was vice-director at the Collegium Albertinum in Bonn from 2003 to 2009 and then became a school-chaplain again, this time at the Gymnasium Marienberg. In 2010, he qualified for the professorship of religious education at the University of Münster at Udo Schmälzle with the topic Faith in conversation. The search for Christian identity and relevance in Alexandrian fathers theology. A model for practical-theological endeavor today? Kohlgraf was Privatdozent at the Westfälische Wilhelms-Universität in Münster until 2013 and then professor of pastoral theology and practical theology at the catholic university of Mainz. He was living in Partenheim in Rhenish Hesse.

On April 18, 2017, Pope Francis nominated Peter Kohlgraf to be Bishop of Mainz. As his motto, he chose Appropinquavit regnum Dei! – The kingdom of God has come near you! ( and ) His Consecration in the Mainz Cathedral was conducted by his predecessor Karl Lehmann on August 27, 2017. He is the youngest diocesan bishop in Germany.

Coat of arms
Kohlgraf's episcopal coat of arms incorporates elements such as the wheel from the arms of the Diocese of Mainz, the key and eight golden lozenges from the Diocese of Worms. In the lower silver shield there are three blue waves that symbolize the river Rhine. The Rhine connects Mainz and Worms with Kohlgrafs home town of Cologne. In addition, the river reminds of the history of life-giving and healing through the flowing water of the Christian faith, springing in baptism . Behind the crest shield the Golden Episcopal Cross. Above it the green episcopal galero with twelve tassels.

Positions 
In December 2018, Kohlgraf said, there can be in future also married priests in Roman Catholic church.
In February 2021, Kohlgraf supported blessing of same-sex marriages in Roman-catholic church.

Nuclear Weapons
Bishop Kohlgraf leads the Pax Christi movement in Germany and has called for the removal of nuclear weapons from Germany.

References 

1967 births
Living people
Bishops of Mainz (1802-present)
21st-century German Roman Catholic bishops
21st-century Roman Catholic bishops in Germany
Clergy from Cologne